Esteban is the stage name of Stephen Paul (born 1948). He is from the Pittsburgh area and has lived in Tempe, Arizona since 1976.

He gained commercial success by selling his instructional DVDs and guitars on QVC and HSN.

Biography
Paul was the oldest of four children. He recounts that he began playing guitar at the age of eight when his uncle brought him a nylon-stringed guitar. He attended South Hills Catholic High School (since absorbed into Seton-La Salle Catholic High School) in Mt. Lebanon. He then attended Carnegie Mellon University, where he double-majored in music and English. At this time, he was teaching approximately 150 students a week and playing in nightclubs.

Segovia
Esteban states that at this point in his studies of the guitar, he felt a strong desire to study with Andrés Segovia. According to Esteban, after a long period where he pursued Segovia by sending notes to the hotels where he was staying, finally meeting Segovia in Los Angeles in 1972 and studied with him intermittently for the next five years, splitting his time between Spain and California.

The extent of the connection between Segovia and Esteban, however, is heavily disputed. Although Esteban did meet Segovia, Esteban is not mentioned in any biography of Segovia, and Esteban never received the public acknowledgment Segovia gave students such as John Williams and Eliot Fisk. Segovia autographed one of his books for Esteban in 1978 with a flattering message, but Segovia is known to have signed hundreds or thousands of such messages.

Musical transformation
Esteban moved from Southern California to Phoenix with his wife, and daughter, Teresa Joy in 1978. During the next two years, he toured playing classical music.

In 1980, while driving his mother home from the airport, Esteban was involved in a collision with a drunk driver. He was left with broken ribs, missing teeth, and a light-sensitive eye. He recovered but was left with nerve damage in his hands. Unable to play the guitar, he sold solar energy systems for Reynolds Aluminum.

During his long recovery, he decided to move away from playing only classical music. After recovering some of the use of his fingers in 1988, he had begun playing again by the end of 1989.

Commercial success
Esteban had been playing at a Hyatt Regency hotel when he released his first album in 1991.  He hired a keyboardist in 1992 and has subsequently added a five-piece band including drummer Joe Morris. Audiences responded well to Esteban's charisma and frequently bought his albums.

In 1999, Esteban came to the attention of Joy Mangano at Ingenious Designs, inventor of the Miracle Mop and other household accessories sold on QVC.  She recognized Esteban's charisma and he was invited to play on QVC in November 1999.  Soon after, Ingenious Designs was bought out by HSN and Esteban achieved commercial success. He sold 132,000 CDs after two appearances on HSN in the summer of 2000, and two of his albums reached the top 54 entries in the Billboard 200.  Esteban quit playing at the Hyatt in 2000. He has since been featured in The Wall Street Journal and People Magazine.  From 2001 to 2003, Esteban released over a dozen additional albums, four of which placed in the lower half of the Billboard 200. He has been featured in various infomercials advertising his guitars and instructional DVDs.

Esteban landed his first major CD distribution deal (with Sony RED Distribution) with the release of The Best of Esteban in October, 2006.

Discography 
 Songs From My Heart (1992)
 Flamenco Y Rosas (1995)
 Enter the Heart (1998)
 Pasión (1999)
 Heart of Gold (2001)
 Spirits of the West (2001)
 What Child Is This (2001)
 Duende (2001)
 All My Love (2001)
 At Home With Esteban (2001)
 Holiday Trilogy (2001)
 Joy to the World (2001)
 Esteban Live (2001)
 Flame, Flamenco & Romance, Vol. 1 (2001)
 Esteban By Request (2001)
 Flame, Flamenco & Romance, Vol. 2 (2002)
 Walk Beside Me (2002)
 Eternal Love (2003)
 Live in Sedona (2003)
 Happy Holidays (2003)
 Esteban & Friends: Live in Sedona (2003)
 Back 2 Back (2003)
 Celebrate the Memories (2004)
 Father/Daughter (2004)
 The New Flamenco Y Rosas (2006)
 The Best of Esteban (2006)

See also
New Flamenco
Flamenco rumba

References

External links
 Official website
 [ Esteban], entry at Allmusic.
 The Tao of Esteban, Gilbert Garcia, Phoenix New Times, September 21, 2000.

1948 births
American country singer-songwriters
Carnegie Mellon University alumni
Living people
People from Mt. Lebanon, Pennsylvania
People from Tempe, Arizona
Country musicians from Pennsylvania
Singer-songwriters from Pennsylvania
Guitarists from Pennsylvania
American male guitarists
20th-century American guitarists
Singer-songwriters from Arizona